The William Young House is a historic home located at New Albany, Indiana.  It was built about 1837, and is a two-story, three bay, Federal style brick I-house.  It features a two-story porch alongside the rear ell.  Much of the interior remains intact.  The house is open as a museum.

It was listed on the National Register of Historic Places in 2010.

See also
 National Register of Historic Places listings in Floyd County, Indiana

References

Historic house museums in Indiana
Houses on the National Register of Historic Places in Indiana
Federal architecture in Indiana
Houses completed in 1837
Museums in Floyd County, Indiana
National Register of Historic Places in Floyd County, Indiana
Houses in Floyd County, Indiana
Buildings and structures in New Albany, Indiana
1837 establishments in Indiana